Kylin Jatavian Hill (born August 18, 1998) is an American football running back who is a free agent. He played college football at Mississippi State, and was selected by the Green Bay Packers of the National Football League (NFL) in the seventh round of the 2021 NFL Draft.

Early years
Hill attended Columbus High School in Columbus, Mississippi. He was The Commercial Dispatch Offensive Player of the Year both his junior and senior years. He committed to Mississippi State University to play college football.

College career
Hill played in all 13 games as a true freshman at Mississippi State in 2017. He rushed for 393 yards on 78 carries with two touchdowns. As a sophomore in 2018 he became the starter. He started all 11 games he played in, missing two due to injury, and rushed for 734 yards on 117 carries with four touchdowns. Hill returned as the starter in 2019. He starred for the Bulldogs in 2019, earning second-team all-conference honors with 1,350 yards rushing and 10 scores on 242 carries (5.6 per) in 13 starts (also 18 receptions for 180 yards and one TD).  With that impressive performance Hill won the 2019 Conerly Trophy, awarded to the top player in the state of Mississippi. In 2020 Hill  opted out from NCAA football after three starts (15 carries, 58 yards, 3.9 yards per carry; 23 receptions, 237 yards, 10.3 average, one TD).

Professional career

On May 1, 2021, Hill was drafted in the seventh Round of the 2021 NFL Draft by the Green Bay Packers as the 256th pick. On May 13, 2021, Packers signed Hill to his four-year rookie contract, worth $3.55 million. He saw his first NFL action on September 12, 2021, against the New Orleans Saints, logging five carries for 14 yards during the 38–3 loss.

On October 28, 2021, Hill suffered a season-ending injury to his right knee during the Packers week 8 game against the Arizona Cardinals. He was placed on injured reserve on November 1, 2021. 

On August 23, 2022, Hill was placed on the reserve/PUP list to start the season. On November 2, 2022, Hill was activated from the PUP list and waived on November 15, 2022.

NFL career statistics

Regular season

References

External links
Mississippi State Bulldogs bio

1998 births
Living people
People from Columbus, Mississippi
Players of American football from Mississippi
American football running backs
Mississippi State Bulldogs football players
Green Bay Packers players